The Quarterback is a 1940 American comedy film directed by H. Bruce Humberstone and written by Robert Pirosh. The film stars Wayne Morris, Virginia Dale, Lillian Cornell, Edgar Kennedy, Alan Mowbray and Jerome Cowan. The film was released on October 16, 1940, by Paramount Pictures.

Plot

College student Jimmy Jones is a timid guy, whereas his twin brother Bill is a fun-loving sort who is in debt with gamblers. When it turns out Bill has an aptitude for football, he pretends to be Jimmy and joins the school's team.

Both brothers end up falling for co-ed Kay Merrill, who is offended by Jimmy's aggressive behavior, not realizing it was really Bill. A gangster, Townley, wants the big game to be lost on purpose so he can collect his gambling debts. Jimmy plays in it himself and does poorly while Bill hitchhikes out of town. But when he hears what's happening on the radio, Bill returns, wins the game, then fights off the crooks.

Cast  
Wayne Morris as Jimmy Jones and Billy Jones
Virginia Dale as Kay Merrill
Lillian Cornell as Sheila
Edgar Kennedy as Pops
Alan Mowbray as Professor Hobbs
Jerome Cowan as Townley
Rod Cameron as Tex
William Frawley as Coach
Walter Catlett as Tom
Frankie Burke as 'Slats' Finney

References

External links 
 

1940 films
American black-and-white films
American football films
American sports comedy films
1940s English-language films
Films directed by H. Bruce Humberstone
Films scored by John Leipold
Paramount Pictures films
1940s sports comedy films
1940 comedy films
1940s American films